William Parks (June 11, 1885 – death unknown), nicknamed "Bubber", was an American Negro league infielder between 1909 and 1922.

A native of Columbus, Ohio, Parks made his Negro leagues debut in 1909 with the Cuban Giants. He went on to enjoy a long career with several teams, finishing his career in 1922 with the Bacharach Giants.

References

External links
  and Seamheads

1885 births
Place of death missing
Year of death missing
Bacharach Giants players
Brooklyn Royal Giants players
Chicago American Giants players
Chicago Giants players
Cuban Giants players
Lincoln Giants players
Lincoln Stars (baseball) players
Pennsylvania Red Caps of New York players
Philadelphia Giants players
Baseball infielders